John Stiles is a Canadian writer.

John Stiles may also refer to:

John Stiles (footballer) (born 1964), British former association footballer
John Dodson Stiles (1822–1896), American politician; U.S. Representative from Pennsylvania
Sir John Haskins Eyles-Stiles, 4th Baronet (1741–1768), British nobility; of the Eyles-Stiles Baronets
John Stiles (pseudonym), a legal pseudonym similar to John Doe

See also
Stiles (surname)
John Styles, English Congregational minister and animal rights writer.
John Styles (entertainer); appeared in the "That's How Murder Snowballs" (1969) episode of Randall and Hopkirk (Deceased) television series
John Stile, English ambassador to Spain